Detective Chinatown is a 2020 Chinese web television series. It is executively produced by Chen Sicheng, and stars an ensemble cast including Roy Chiu, Janine Chang, and Chen Zheyuan. The series is separated into three cases, with the first two focusing on Lin Mo, while the third follows Noda Koji.

The web series is designed as part of the Detective Chinatown franchise universe. It currently holds a 7.2 on Douban out of more than 194,000 user reviews.

Synopsis

Mandala's Dance (Ep 1-4) 
A group of four women who were best friends in high school report strange individual occurrences relating to the god Brahma. One of the women jumps off a building to her death, leading to Lin Mo (Roy Chiu), the apprentice of Tang Ren, to partner up with new Thai policewoman, Sa Sha (Zhang Yishang), to investigate the occurrences and the apparent suicide.

Name of the Rose (Ep 5-8) 
A prequel to the first case, which explores Lin Mo's backstory as a crime scene disguiser and his relationship with the mysterious Ivy (Janine Chang), who he meets while trying to clear his name from a murder he did not commit.

Spirits' Invitational Race (Ep 9-12) 
Noda Koji (野田昊二; Chen Zheyuan), and his four friends: Lu Qingqing, Yamamoto Yuta (山本 佑太), Liu Feng and Cheng Tianshun, enter the Ghost's Invitational video game tournament, where a mysterious being locks the entire arena down and challenges the players into a death game. The being forces the players to solve his (the Ghost's) own death by a certain time limit, or else he would kill one of the players.

Cast

Arc 1 

 Roy Qiu as Lin Mo
 Zhang Yishang as Sa Sha
 Xie Wenxuan as Lin Shuiqing
 Wang Zhener as Ah Wen
 Gao Ye as Di Nan
 Huang Kaijie as Qin Jun
 Dai Mo as Pei Shan
 Wang Yang as Cha Ya
 Deng Enxi as Xiao Ai

Arc 2 

 Roy Qiu as Lin Mo
 Janine Chang as Ivy
 Zhang Yishang as Sa Sha
 Zhang Songwen as Wen Song
 Chen Yusi as An Qi
 Deng Enxi as Xiao Ai
 Chang Shih as Du Lang
 Zhang Jingwei as Kun Da
 Chang Kuo-chu as Lao Yu
 Ma Yuke as Jia De
 Hu Lianxin as Mei Xin

Arc 3 

 Chen Zheyuan as Yetian Hao'er/Noda Koji
 Cheng Xiao as Lu Qingqing
 Ma Boqian as Shan Ben You Tai
 Li Mingxuan as Liu Feng
 Cui Yuxin as Cheng Tianshun
 Huang Jianwei as Lao K
 Bryant Chang as Ah Ji
 Kao Yinghsuan as Diao Delong
 Ding Chuncheng as Wu Xichao
 Yen Tsao as Li Chang E
 Shi Mingshuai as Ma Guoqiang
 Wang Keyuan as Xiao Fei
 Ye Ziqi as Da Wang
 Suo Lang Mei Qi as Er Wang
 Dong Nina as San Wang
 Guo Jiamin as Si Wang
 Xiao Ai as Wu Wang
 Clara as Beauty

Cameos 

 Wang Baoqiang as Tang Ren
 Shang Yuxian as Kiko
 Xiao Yang as Kun Tai
 Liu Haoran as Qin Feng

Production 
Shooting began in December 2018 and lasted 114 days, with total length of more than 2000 hours shooting. Filming locations included Bangkok, Kaohsiung, and Tokyo. The largest scene film utilized more than 800 actors at once, with the set area exceeding 11,000 square meters. Shooting also mobilized military helicopters and a Boeing 747 for specific scenes.

Original soundtrack 
The original soundtrack of Detective Chinatown was released on January 1, 2020 by Yitong Productions. A total of 53 tracks were released.

References

External links 

 Detective Chinatown on Sina Weibo
 Detective Chinatown on Douban

2020 Chinese television series debuts
2020 Chinese television series endings
Chinese crime television series
Mandarin-language television shows
Chinese web series
IQIYI original programming
Television shows based on Chinese novels